Leonard Carlitz (December 26, 1907 – September 17, 1999) was an American mathematician.  Carlitz supervised 44 doctorates at Duke University and published over 770 papers.

Chronology 

 1907 Born Philadelphia, PA, USA
 1927 BA, University of Pennsylvania
 1930 PhD, University of Pennsylvania, 1930 under Howard Mitchell, who had studied under Oswald Veblen at Princeton
 1930–31 at Caltech with E. T. Bell
 1931 married Clara Skaler
 1931–32 at Cambridge with G. H. Hardy
 1932 Joined the faculty of Duke University where he served for 45 years
 1938 to 1973 Editorial Board Duke Mathematical Journal (Managing Editor from 1945.)
 1939 Birth of son Michael
 1940 Supervision of his first doctoral student E. F. Canaday, awarded 1940
 1945 Birth of son Robert
 1964 First James B. Duke Professor in Mathematics
 1977 Supervised his 44th and last doctoral student, Jo Ann Lutz, awarded 1977
 1977 Retired
 1990 Death of wife Clara, after 59 years of marriage
 1999 September 17 Died in Pittsburgh, PA

Mathematical work 
 The Carlitz module is generalized by the Drinfeld module
 An identity regarding Bernoulli numbers
 Carlitz wrote about Bessel polynomials
 He introduced Al-Salam–Carlitz polynomials.
 Carlitz' identity for bicentric quadrilaterals
 He conjectured the Carlitz-Wan conjecture, later proved by Daqing Wan.

Publication 

Leonard Carlitz published about 771 technical papers comprising approximately 7,000 pages. The effort to edit his collected works, undertaken originally by Professor John Brillhart, is ongoing.

See also
Bateman polynomials
Carlitz exponential
Carlitz polynomial (disambiguation)
Maillet's determinant
Reciprocal Fibonacci constant

References
^ Joel V. Brawley, John Brillhart and Henry W. Gould, "Recollections of Leonard Carlitz", Acta Arithmetica, Vol. 152(2012), No. 4, 361–372.
^ Joel V. Brawley, John Brillhart, and Henry W. Gould (editors), "The publications of Leonard Carlitz", Acta Arithmetica. Vol. 152(2012), No. 4, 373–405. Annotated Catalogue of Carlitz's 773 publications.

External links 

Obituary at Duke's Math Newsletter
 

 zbMATH.org author profile

20th-century American mathematicians
Duke University faculty
University of Pennsylvania alumni
Institute for Advanced Study visiting scholars
Combinatorialists
1907 births
1999 deaths